Foundations of Differential Geometry is an influential 2-volume mathematics book on differential geometry written by Shoshichi Kobayashi and Katsumi Nomizu. The first volume was published in 1963 and the second in 1969, by Interscience Publishers. Both were published again in 1996 as Wiley Classics Library.

The first volume considers manifolds, fiber bundles, tensor analysis, connections in bundles, and the role of Lie groups. It also covers holonomy, the de Rham decomposition theorem and the Hopf–Rinow theorem. According to the review of James Eells, it has a "fine expositional style" and consists of a "special blend of algebraic, analytic, and geometric concepts". Eells says it is "essentially a textbook (even though there are no exercises)". An advanced text, it has a "pace geared to a [one] term graduate course".

The second volume considers submanifolds of Riemannian manifolds, the Gauss map, and the second fundamental form. It continues with geodesics on Riemannian manifolds, Jacobi fields, the Morse index, the Rauch comparison theorems, and the Cartan–Hadamard theorem. Then it ascends to complex manifolds, Kähler manifolds, homogeneous spaces, and symmetric spaces. In a discussion of curvature  representation of characteristic classes of principal bundles (Chern–Weil theory), it covers Euler classes, Chern classes, and Pontryagin classes. The second volume also received a favorable review by J. Eells in Mathematical Reviews.

References 

Mathematics textbooks
1963 non-fiction books
1969 non-fiction books